Md Zalif Naquiyudin Wan Abu Bakar Sidek (born 1 August 1985) is a Malaysian actor and comedian, best known for his acting roles in television, film and commercials.

Career
Before starting his acting career, Zalif first ventured into commercial acting around 2007. In 2008, he joined KRU Studios as a Promotion Executive. Despite working at KRU Studios, Zalif still spends some time on advertising. Among the advertisements he has made are Panadol Soluble Actifast and the DiGi mascot with yellow costumes and Astro First 'ambassadors.'

Zalif made his first film appearance through a side character in the comedy action film Bini-Biniku Gangster directed by Ismail Bob Hashim. He was entrusted by director Hashim Rejab to succeed in the lead role with Lisa Surihani and Mia Sara Nasuha in the film Papa I Love You which was released on 29 December 2011, revolving around the love and dilemma faced by a single father towards his daughter after his wife's death. The following year, Zalif was paired with Zahiril Adzim in the comedy series, Paan dan Paiz directed by Shahrulezad Mohameddin with a script written by Shamsull Hashim, telling the story of two close friends, Paan and Paiz who have known each others since childhood. Zalif later starred in Razif Rashid's Islamic comedy film, Aji Noh Motor, which was released on 20 September 2012.

He made a special appearance as Gangster Poyo in the film Langgar directed by Sein Ruffedge starring Ady Putra, Namron, Hans Isaac and Zul Huzaimy. Zalif left Metrowealth Pictures after his contract expired and decided to manage his career on his own because he was confident that experience would help him stand stronger.

Personal life
Zalif was born and raised in Kuala Terengganu, Terengganu. He previously had a relationship with actress and singer, Rafidah Ibrahim who was also a cousin to singer Siti Nurhaliza around 2012, but their relationship ended due to creative differences.

Filmography

Film

Drama

Commercial

Awards and nominations

References

External links
 

1985 births
Living people
Malaysian male actors
21st-century Malaysian male actors
Malaysian people of Malay descent
Malaysian Muslims
People from Terengganu
Malaysian television actors
Malaysian film actors